Liberty University (LU) is a private Baptist university in Lynchburg, Virginia. It is affiliated with the Southern Baptist Conservatives of Virginia (Southern Baptist Convention). Founded in 1971 by Jerry Falwell Sr. and Elmer L. Towns, Liberty is among the world's largest Christian universities and the largest private non-profit universities in the United States by total student enrollment. Most of its enrollment is in online courses; in 2020, for example, the university enrolled about 15,000 in its residential program and 80,000 online.

Liberty University consists of 17 colleges, including a school of osteopathic medicine, a school of law, and a seminary.  Liberty's athletic teams compete in Division I of the NCAA and are collectively known as the Liberty Flames. Their college football team is an NCAA Division I FBS Independent, while most of their other sports teams compete in the ASUN Conference. Their athletics program will join Conference USA as a full member in 2023.

Liberty, whose website and officials speak of "training Champions for Christ", requires undergraduate students to take three Evangelical Bible-studies classes. The university's honor code, called the "Liberty Way,” prohibits premarital sex, cohabitation, and alcohol use. 

Described as a "bastion of the Christian right", the university played a prominent role in Republican politics under Falwell and his son and successor Jerry Falwell Jr.; in 2021, Liberty President Jerry Prevo said getting conservative candidates elected to office was "one of our main goals".

History 

The school was founded as Lynchburg Baptist College in 1971 by televangelist Jerry Falwell Sr. and Elmer L. Towns. Falwell, already a pastor of Thomas Road Baptist Church, served as the first president of the school. From 1979 to the late 1980s, Falwell Sr. also headed the Moral Majority, a right-wing political organization. 

The school changed its name to Liberty Baptist College in 1976. Officials said the change aimed to distance the school from the name Lynchburg, which is often mistakenly associated with lynching; co-founder Towns also said that Falwell Sr., wanted to use the name "Liberty" to ride the enthusiasm for the Bicentennial of the United States. 

The name changed again in 1984, to Liberty University. In 1985, the university launched a distance-learning program by mailing VHS tapes to students; this was the forerunner to Liberty University's current online program. Two years later, Liberty University's 501(c)(3) tax-exempt status was formally recognized by the IRS.

In its early decades, the university was held afloat financially by major donors. The university was placed on probation multiple times in the 1990s by the Southern Association of Colleges and Schools due to heavy debt loads. In 1990, the university's debt totaled $110 million; in 1996, it totaled $40million. In 1994, Rev. Sun Myung Moon's Women's Federation for World Peace funneled $3.5 million to Liberty University.

Since 1999, Liberty has had an informal relationship with the Southern Baptist Conservatives of Virginia, two of whose members sit on the university board of trustees.

In 2001, days after 9/11, Jerry Falwell Sr. "blamed the terrorist attacks on gays, lesbians, feminists, abortion doctors, and the ACLU."

In 2004, Liberty University named its School of Government after Falwell family friend Senator Jesse Helms.

In 2005, Barron's Profiles of American Colleges ranked undergraduate admission to LU as "competitive", its fourth-highest of six ranks. When high-speed Internet connections became more widespread around 2005, Liberty began to offer online courses to a larger adult population.

After Falwell Sr. died in 2007, his son Jerry Falwell Jr. became the university's second president. At the time, the university listed $259 million in assets.

Liberty University Online Academy was formed in 2007, serving 23 students.

In 2009, Liberty University withdrew official recognition of the student Young Democrats club, saying that the club's political positions, including support of abortion rights, conflicted with the school's.

In 2010, Liberty students received about $445 million in federal financial aid money, the highest total of any school in Virginia and one of the highest in the country. A 56 percent increase over the previous year, the money was mostly in the form of student loans, but also included some grants and other forms of aid.

In 2011, Liberty blocked campus access to a local Lynchburg newspaper, the News & Advocate, after the newspaper reported on the school's dependence on federal financial aid. Falwell Jr. said that the decision to block the newspaper was unrelated to content published in the paper.

In 2012, Liberty University acquired the former Lynchburg Sears building to house Liberty University online and a television station.

In 2017, Forbess list of America's Top Colleges ranked Liberty University No. 585 of 650 "Top Colleges", No. 231 as a "Research University", 371 as a "Private College", and 136 "in the South". Forbes also gave Liberty a "Forbes Financial Grade" of B+.

, the university's endowment stood at more than $1billion and gross assets exceeded $2billion.

In 2019, Will E. Young, a former editor-in-chief of Liberty's Champion student newspaper, described the "culture of fear" at Liberty University, noting that the school "founded on principles of fundamental Christianity, is now a place that has zero tolerance for new questions and ideas. Those who harbor them must remain silent, or leave." Young later argued that Liberty must address its racist past, beginning with Jerry Falwell, Sr. and that it must include people of color and LGBTQ people as it makes decisions.

Ben Howe, whose parents worked for Falwell's Liberty University, published The Immoral Majority: Why Evangelicals Chose Political Power over Christian Values. The book included a critique of Jerry Falwell Jr. who posed "for a picture in front of a Playboy magazine with [Donald] Trump on the cover."

In spring 2020, during the COVID-19 pandemic, Liberty allowed some students to return to campus after spring break over the objections of the city's mayor and contrary to the practices of most U.S. colleges and universities. When a ProPublica reporter and New York Times photographer investigated why the university remained partially open, the university pushed the local district attorney to charge them with trespassing.

A few months later, then-president Falwell Jr. posted a picture of Virginia governor Ralph Northman's black face in a tweet that many found racist. Some staff resigned in protest; some black students pursued transfers, many contending that the tweet was a symptom of a larger problem at the university. In response to internal and external criticism, Liberty University officials hired Kelvin Edwards, an alumnus and former NFL player, to lead diversity initiatives on campus, then fired him three months later. Edwards sued the university, alleging a breach of contract.

Falwell Jr. was placed on indefinite leave on August 7, 2020, after media began reporting allegations, including photographs, of personal and professional impropriety. A few weeks later, he resigned. He claimed that he was entitled to $10.5 million in compensation from the university because he resigned without either admitting to wrongdoing or having formal accusations opened against him.

At the end of Falwell Jr.'s presidency in 2020, the university listed over $2.5 billion in assets. Following Falwell's resignation, Times Higher Education reported that Liberty University was "facing growing criticism over perceived resistance to diversity" following the departures of Edwards, board chair Allen McFarland, and pastor David Nasser. Jonathan Falwell, a son of Jerry Falwell Sr., replaced Nasser.

In late 2020, three reform efforts took place.  A group of Liberty University alumni called Save71 was organized in an effort to reform the school. Three Liberty University athletes, Kennedi Williams, Dee Brown, and TreShaun Clark, organized a Black Lives Matter protest on campus, drawing a crowd of about two hundred people. Student leaders also created an online petition to force Liberty to shut down the school's think tank, the Falkirk Center, named after Jerry Falwell Jr. and conservative activist Charlie Kirk. The petition garnered about 400 signatures.

In November 2020, Liberty University graduate and athletics booster Bob Good won a seat in the US House of Representatives, making him the first Liberty graduate to be in the House.

In April 2021, Liberty University sued Falwell Jr. for $40 million in damages for breach of contract and violation of fiduciary duty. In the same month, the Liberty University board of trustees replaced acting chairman Allen McFarland, the first African American board chair, with Tim Lee, "a pro-Trump pastor."

In July 2021, the university was sued by 12 anonymous women, including two employees, who alleged that the university created an environment that increased the likelihood of sexual assault and rape in violation of federal Title IX law. The lawsuit alleged that the school's student honor code makes it difficult to report sexual violence because it does not clearly shield students; that the university had a tacit policy that condoned sexual violence, especially by male student athletes, by weighing a denial more heavily than an allegation; and that the school retaliates against women who report sexual violence. In one of the alleged incidents, a 15-year-old who was allegedly attacked by Jesse Matthew, who later confessed to murdering Hannah Graham, was told she would be criminally charged with filing a false report, before they began an "investigation" into her claim, which allegedly only consisted of a demand that she strip and submit to being photographed by the chief of police which she refused to do. She later was not taken to the hospital but the police later pestered her until she agreed to be photographed naked by a female debate coach. In a written response to the lawsuit, Liberty University officials said "The allegations are “deeply troubling, if they turn out to be true," and said that would look into each allegation detailed in the lawsuit.

Also in July 2021, Liberty University diversity retention officer LeeQuan McLaurin, a black gay man, filed a discrimination lawsuit against the school, claiming that his supervisor's view that Christianity condemns homosexuality forced him to quit.

An October 2021, a ProPublica investigative report found that Liberty University discouraged and dismissed students coming forward about sexual assault; former students said they were threatened with punishment by coming forward with accusations of sexual assault. Politico also reported that a former Liberty University official, Scott Lamb, also accused Liberty University of violating its 501(c)(3) nonprofit status. Politico had previously reported that the school had invested in "Republican causes and efforts to promote the Trump administration."

In fall 2021, an outbreak of COVID-19 forced all classes on the Lynchburg campus to go online-only for two weeks. More than 400 students and 50 staff members tested positive for the virus. The campus did not require COVID-19 vaccinations, masks, or social distancing. Outdoor events, including a convocation and football game, were scheduled to continue.

Campus 
 

The 17-story, 245-foot Freedom Tower, completed in February 2018, is the tallest building in Lynchburg. The tower holds a 25-bell carillon that includes a replica of the Liberty Bell.

The Hancock Welcome Center, built in 2012, is a three-level, 33,000-square-foot Jeffersonian-style building featuring an atrium, boardroom, theater, lounges, a banquet hall, several smaller counseling rooms, and a patio with a view of the Blue Ridge Mountains. The Jerry Falwell Sr. Center: Inspiring Champions for Christ, opening in 2023, will be attached to the Hancock Welcome Center.

Liberty University's Center for Music & Worship hosts the Miss Virginia beauty competition which sends the winner of the state to represent it in the Miss America Pageant.

Construction was completed in August 2009 on the Liberty Mountain Snowflex Centre, a synthetic ski slope featuring Snowflex; the centre was designed by England's Briton Engineering. The first of its kind in the United States, it includes beginner, intermediate, and advanced slopes.

The Observatory Center opened in spring 2013 next to the Equestrian Center. The dome has a classroom that can fit up to 20 people. It houses a  RC Optical Systems Truss Ritchey-Chrétien and several Celestron CPC 800 8-inch Schmidt-Cassegrain telescopes on pedestals, able to roll out under a roof. The observatory serves three purposes: instruction, public nights and research. Student Activities controls the use of the observatory and is open to all students.

In 2018, Liberty University opened a $3.2 million on-campus shooting range to train students to protect themselves against shooters and terrorists.

Libraries and museums

Jerry Falwell Library 
The four-story, 170,000-square-foot Jerry Falwell Library opened in January 2014 with more than 250,000 items and room for another 170,000. They are accessible via a robot-assisted storage and retrieval system, which locates requested items within a large storage room and delivers them to the front desk. There are 150 public computers throughout the building for electronic archive research. The library has group study rooms, writable walls, balconies, terraces, and a vegetative roof. At its entrance stands a 24-foot media wall, powered by three Microsoft Kinect units and integrated using a custom program that allows visitors to scroll through university news, browse pictures contributed from students, and learn about upcoming university events.

The $50 million library is part of a larger $500 million building and expansion plan announced by Liberty University.

Biblical Museum
The museum includes artifacts from the Holy Land and Biblical culture, from 3,000 B.C. to the 6th century A.D., with special exhibits of the Dead Sea Scrolls, the Jewish Temple, an Authentic Last Supper room, Daily Life in the Bible, Ancient Egypt, and Fossils and the Flood.

National Civil War Chaplains Museum 
The National Civil War Chaplains Museum contains exhibits about clergy members and religious activity during the Civil War era. It is the only museum in the nation devoted to this purpose. The mission of the museum is to "educate the public about the role of chaplains, priests, and rabbis and religious organizations in the Civil War; to promote the continuing study of the many methods of dissemination of religious doctrine and moral teachings during the War; to preserve religious artifacts, and to present interpretive programs that show the influence of religion on the lives of political and military personnel." A 501(c)(3) organization, the museum rents space from Liberty University's DeMoss Center. It has 10,000 square feet, with a 50-seat video theatre, archive displays, a research library, and bookstore.

The museum commemorates Catholic, Protestant, and Jewish chaplains (including African-American chaplains), and houses publications and artifacts from both the Union and Confederate militaries. There are several areas in the museum that are given special attention including:
 The role of the United States Christian Commission, which is the forerunner to today's USO and Red Cross.
 "The relationship of religion to political and military leaders, common soldiers, and the public in the North and South."

Carter Glass Mansion 
The Carter Glass Mansion, also called Montview, is a house built in 1923 for Carter Glass, a newspaper publisher, U.S. senator who worked to disenfranchise African Americans, U.S. Treasury Secretary under President Woodrow Wilson, and Chairman of the Senate Appropriations Committee and President Pro Tempore of the Senate during the presidency of Franklin D. Roosevelt. The -story house, which is flanked by slightly smaller ells, has  walls of quartz fieldstone quarried from the property and a grey gambrel roof. It is listed on the National Register of Historic Places and Virginia Landmarks Register.

The   estate was purchased by Liberty University in the late 1970s to be the headquarters of the university administration. It housed the main office of university founder Jerry Falwell, who died at his desk on May 15, 2007. Falwell and his wife were buried on the rear lawn of the mansion and a memorial to Falwell was placed there, overlooking the rest of the campus. The estate is now largely a tourist site, with Falwell's office preserved in its 2007 condition and the upstairs section of the mansion converted to a bed and breakfast for Liberty University guests.

Center for Creation Studies and Creation Hall
According to its literature, the Center for Creation Studies is committed to the study of the origin of the universe, the earth, life, and diversification of species, equipping students to contend for their faith in the creation account in Genesis using science, reason, and the Scriptures. Young Earth creationism asserts that the Earth was created by supernatural acts by God approximately 6,000 and 10,000 years ago rather than the geological explanation of more than 4.5 billion years.

David A. DeWittis is the director of the Center for Creation Studies.

Creation Hall, on the second floor of the Center for Natural Sciences, is "dedicated to promoting young-Earth creation." Displays include replicas of post-Flood humans and fossils buried during Noah's flood.

Athletic venues

Williams Stadium
Williams Stadium is the home field for the Liberty Flames football team. Opened in 1989, the stadium seats 25,000 spectators. An indoor practice facility was opened in 2017 at a cost of $29 million.

Liberty Arena
The Liberty Arena is the home of the men's and women's basketball teams and women's volleyball. The $65 million, 125,000-square-foot space, which opened in 2020, seats 4,000 spectators.

Liberty Natatorium
Liberty Natatorium is 75,000 square feet and contains a 9-lane Olympic-size swimming pool as well as a diving well 17 feet deep and fitted with 1-meter and 3-meter springboards and 10-meter, 7.5-meter, 5-meter, 3-meter, and 1-meter diving platforms. The inaugural competitive swimming event held in the swimming pool was the 2018 TYR Junior National Cup in March 2018. In 2020, one of the diving platforms collapsed for an unknown reason. Since its opening, there have also been facility issues associated with the timing system used in competitive swimming events.

Liberty Mountain
The Liberty Mountain area consists of the Hydaway Outdoor Center and its 31-acre lake, the Liberty University Equestrian Center, Liberty Mountain Gun Club, Liberty Mountain Snowflex Centre, Astronomical Observatory and the Liberty Mountain Trail System.

Governance and leadership
The university is governed by a 30-member board of trustees that includes Jonathan Falwell, the son and brother (respectively) of the two former university presidents. Additionally, two ministers serve as Trustee Emeriti.

Jerry Prevo is the university's president. He formerly served as the chair of the board of trustees and was appointed president after the son of the university's founder, Jerry Falwell, Jr., resigned from his position as president in 2020.

Faculty
Unlike most other research universities, faculty (outside the law school) are not offered tenure, giving them less influence in governing the university than is common. Most teachers are adjunct labor. Faculty must inform leadership in advance if they are speaking with the media.

In 2018,The New York Times reported that faculty at Liberty University acknowledge that Liberty University Online is a steep drop-off in quality relative to the traditional classes at the university. The online division at the Liberty University is a significant revenue source for the university.

Academics 

, Liberty University offered over 550 total programs, 366 on campus and 289 online. There are 144 graduate programs and four doctoral programs offered on campus. It is classified among "Doctoral/Professional Universities" and is recognized by the National Security Agency (NSA) and the Department of Homeland Security as a National Center of Academic Excellence in Cyber Defense Education.

College of Arts and Sciences 
The Liberty University College of Arts and Sciences includes eight different departments and offers PhD, master's, bachelor's, and associate degrees.

The college teaches Young Earth creationism, a pseudoscience in its "creationist studies" classes.

College of Osteopathic Medicine 
The Liberty University College of Osteopathic Medicine (LUCOM) opened in August 2014, funded in part by a $12 million matching grant from the Virginia Tobacco Commission.

In July 2015 the college of osteopathic medicine opened Liberty Mountain Medical Group LLC, a primary care clinic serving the greater Lynchburg area.

The college received initial accreditation from the American Osteopathic Association Commission on Osteopathic College Accreditation (AOA-COCA) in 2018. In that same year the medical school launched its first residency program, focused on neuromusculoskeletal treatment.

Helms School of Government 
Liberty's Helms School of Government offers degrees in criminal justice, government and public administration, international relations, pre-law, public policy, strategic intelligence, fire administration, etc. in both bachelor's and master's degrees. The Helms School of Government is named after Senator Jesse Helms.

Rawlings School of Divinity 
The Liberty University Rawlings School of Divinity (formerly Liberty Divinity School) was founded in 1973. The Rawlings School of Divinity currently offers 44 bachelor's degrees, 44 master's degrees, and 14 doctorate degrees; the Divinity School's graduate programs are accredited by the ATS. Many programs are on campus only, while others are available online. The school includes The Center for Apologetics and Cultural Engagement to defending the Christian faith in light of "trending issues like racism, sexuality, and morality in today’s society...and "engage the culture around us, learning to speak and act out of a gospel" The Rawlings School of Divinity is housed in the Freedom Tower. The Rawlings school is the largest divinity school in the world based on the number of students enrolled in degree programs.

School of Aeronautics 
Liberty offers 11 bachelor's degrees in aeronautics from professional pilot to UAS. In 2018, Liberty's School of Aeronautics had more than 1,200 students in-person and online. Liberty has worked with American Eagle, Piedmont Airlines and Wayman Aviation to alleviate their pilot shortages.

School of Behavioral Sciences 
The School of Behavioral Sciences includes four departments: Community Care & Counseling, Counselor Education & Family Studies, Psychology, and Social Work. It has an acceptance rate of 38%. The Community Care & Counseling department offers 28 master's degrees and four doctoral degrees. The Counselor Education & Family Studies department offers five master's degrees and one doctoral degree. The Psychology department offers two associate degrees, 14 bachelor's degrees, six master's degrees, and six doctoral degrees. The Social Work department offers one bachelor's degree.  As of 2020, the dean was Kenyon C. Knapp.

School of Business 
Liberty University's School of Business offers 46 bachelor's, 67 master's, and 14 doctoral degrees. Liberty's school of business is accredited by ACBSP. In 2019, the School of Business was nearing completion of a new 78,000 sq. ft. building.

School of Communication & the Arts 
The School of Communication & the Arts includes five departments: Cinematic Arts, Digital Media and Journalism, Strategic and Personal Communication, Studio & Digital Arts, and Theatre Arts. There are over 12,000 residential and online students enrolled in this school.

Zaki Gordon Cinematic Arts Center 
Liberty University offers a Bachelor of Science in Cinematic Arts Degree, which is based in the new Zaki Gordon Cinematic Arts Center (ZGCAC).

School of Education 
The School of Education currently enrolls 4,441 students.

School of Engineering 
Liberty's School of Engineering offers degrees in computer engineering, civil engineering, electrical engineering, industrial & systems engineering, and mechanical engineering. The School of Engineering is accredited through the Accreditation Board for Engineering and Technology (ABET). In 2017, Liberty bought The Center for Advanced Engineering and Research (CAER) facility in Bedford, Virginia.

The School of Engineering has spent considerable resources on a project titled "Simulating Genesis" "to show how the laws of physics align with biblical history."

School of Law 
82% of Liberty University School of Law's Class of 2018 obtained full-time, bar passage, or JD-required employment nine months after graduation, according to ABA-required disclosures. The law school has been accredited by the American Bar Association since 2010. In February 2019, all of its graduates who took the Virginia Bar Exam passed. The school is ranked 147-192 out of 196 law schools ranked by the U.S. News & World Report in its 2023 law school rankings.

Center for Law and Government
In 2017, Liberty announced its new Center for Law and Government will be led by former U.S. representative Robert Hurt. The Center will house the Liberty University School of Law and the Jesse Helms School of Government.

School of Music 
The departments of worship and music studies and of music and humanities merged in 2012 into a school of music, composed of two distinct centers. The School of Music offers 32 bachelor's degrees, 15 master's degrees, and one doctoral degree.

College of Applied Studies and Academic Success 
Liberty University's College of Applied Studies and Academic Success houses the Academic Success Center, the Eagle Scholar's Program, Technical Studies, Continuing Education, and Success Courses.

Technical studies and trades 
Along with over 15 other associate programs, Liberty offers vocational education with various associate degrees in carpentry; electrical; heating, ventilation, air conditioning (HVAC); plumbing; and welding. These trades are approved by the National Center for Construction Education and Research.

Student outcomes
According to the College Scorecard, Liberty University has a graduation rate of 34%. Median salary after attending ranges from $11,455 (AA in Teacher Education) to $72,022 (Electrical Engineering). 54% earn more than a high school graduate. Of those repaying student loans two years after entering repayment, 26% were in forbearance, 25% were not making progress, 14% were making progress, 14% were in deferment, 9% defaulted, 5% were paid in full, 5% were delinquent, and 2% had their loans discharged.

Rankings

Liberty University is ranked #331–440 in the U.S. News & World Report ranking of "National Universities". It was also tied for 340th place out of 388 schools for social mobility. LU is ranked 391 out of 391 schools in the Washington Monthly.

Liberty is among the ten colleges that enrolled the most undergraduates in fall 2018 according to US News. When including online students, Liberty enrolled more students than any university in the United States as of 2018.

Liberty has an endowment of $1.71 billion, the 68th largest in the U.S.

Liberty is consistently ranked as the "Most Conservative College in America" by Niche and various other publications. Niche also ranks Liberty as the #5 best 'Online College in America' and as having the #5 best 'College Campus in America'. Its college campus is ranked as one of the 10 largest college campuses in the U.S., with over 7,000 acres. Liberty has also been ranked one of the ten most conservative colleges in the U.S. by Young America's Foundation.

Affiliation 
It is affiliated with the Southern Baptist Conservatives of Virginia (Southern Baptist Convention).

Accreditation 
Liberty was founded in 1971 and received regional accreditation through the  Southern Association of Colleges and Schools (SACS) accreditation in 1980, which was reaffirmed in 2016. In addition, it was accredited by the Transnational Association of Christian Colleges and Schools (TRACS) in September 1984, but resigned its TRACS accreditation on November 6, 2008. Liberty has more than 60 accredited degree granting programs. The law school, which opened in August 2004, gained provisional accreditation from the American Bar Association (ABA) in 2006 and was granted full accreditation in 2010. The medical school, which opened in 2014, is accredited by the American Osteopathic Association Commission on Osteopathic College Accreditation (AOA-COCA). On December 9, 2009, Chancellor Jerry Falwell Jr. announced that "Liberty University has received Level VI accreditation from the Southern Association of Colleges and Schools (SACS). This is the highest classification from SACS and is reserved for colleges and universities that offer four or more doctoral degrees.
Liberty is also accredited by:
Accreditation Board for Engineering and Technology (ABET),
National Council for Accreditation of Teacher Education (NCATE),
Commission on Collegiate Nursing Education (CCNE),
Aviation Accreditation Board International (AABI),
National Association of Schools of Music (NASM),
Commission on Accreditation of Athletic Training Education (CAATE),
Accreditation of Allied Health Education Programs (CAAHEP),
Council for Accreditation of Counseling and Related Educational Programs (CACREP),
Accreditation Council for Business Schools and Programs (ACBSP),
and the Commission on Sport Management Education (COSMA).

Academic journals and other publications
The Journal of Statesmanship and Public Policy explores topics in the realms of national security, international relations, domestic policy, and political philosophy from a deeply thoughtful, ethical, and Christian perspective." Recent articles have been published on strict constructionism and critical race theory. 

The Liberty Bell News is an online publication whose mission is "to maintain the vision of the founder, Dr. Jerry Falwell Sr., to develop and train Christ-centered men and women with the values, knowledge, and skills essential to impact the world."

Student life 
Student life includes:
Mandatory Christian community service of 20 hours a semester (CSER) 
Gender-segregated dorms
A dress code for classes

Safety 
In 2017, the school invited Ray Rice, who had been videotaped beating his fiancée three years earlier, to give a lecture on domestic violence. In 2021, a dozen anonymous women sued the school, charging that it failed to curb domestic violence and sexual assault on campus. A 2021 ProPublica investigation found that "an ethos of sexual purity, as embodied by the Liberty Way, has led to school officials discouraging, dismissing and even blaming female students who have tried to come forward with claims of sexual assault."

Demographics 

In fall 2017, the acceptance rate for new first-time, full-time students entering Liberty's resident program was 30%. In 2011, the overall acceptance rate, which includes online students, was 51 percent. Liberty University Online is an open enrollment institution.

Liberty's black population has declined from 19.9 percent in 2011 to 10.4 percent in 2019. The Black graduation rate was 17 percent.

On-campus demographics
As of 2021, the residential student body is 74% White, 5% Latino, 4% Black, 3% two or more races, and 2% Asian or Pacific Islander, less than 1% Native American, and 7% "other". Its male-to-female ratio is 45% to 54%.

Online demographics
Including online students, Liberty's undergraduate population in 2017 was 51% White, 26.5% race/ethnicity unknown, 15.4% Black or African American, 2.3% two or more races, 1.7% Hispanic/Latino, 1.4% non-resident alien, 0.9% Asian, 0.6% American Indian or Alaskan native, 0.2% Native Hawaiian/Pacific Islander. All 50 states and Washington, D.C., are represented along with 86 countries. The online male-to-female ratio is 40% to 60%. More than 30,000 military students and over 850 international students attend Liberty.

Liberty ranks 174th out of 2,475 schools in overall diversity, 94th out of 3,012 schools in age diversity, and 82nd out of 2,525 schools in location diversity.

, when including online students, LU was the largest Evangelical Christian university in the world. , LU was the largest private non-profit university in the United States. In terms of combined traditional and distance learning students, Liberty University is the 7th-largest four-year university, and the largest university in Virginia.

LGBTQ+ stance 
The Guardian has reported that LGBTQ+ students hide their dating behavior in order to graduate and to avoid being fined.

Under Liberty's honor code, sexual relations are only permitted in a Biblically ordained marriage between a natural-born man and a natural-born woman. Students have criticized the university for being unwelcoming to LGBT students. Campus Pride, an organization that advocates for LGBT rights on college campuses, listed Liberty University as one of the worst universities for LGBT students. Falwell Jr. said the university does not have an anti-gay bias, and some gay students have defended the university. However, the school offers conversion therapy to gay students, a practice that many find offensive and studies have shown is often harmful. The student handbook also describes any gay sex as prohibited by the Bible, and thus prohibited by the school. In 2021, a former Liberty University student was part of a class action lawsuit filed against the U.S. Department of Education alleging that the institution should not be eligible to receive federal funding because of its discriminatory practices against LGBT students.

In 2015, Liberty University denied the discounted tuition to same-sex and trans spouses of military personnel that it offered to heterosexual military couples. In 2016, the university ordered a version of a psychology textbook that omitted sections with LGBTQ+-focused content.

The school says it does not engage in unlawful discrimination or harassment because of race, color, ancestry, religion, age, sex, national origin, pregnancy or childbirth, disability or military veteran status. But it "reserves its right to discriminate on the basis of religion to the extent that applicable law respects its right to act in furtherance of its religious objectives."

Honor code 
The Liberty University honor code forbids students to be alone with a member of the opposite sex "at an off-campus residence" or to have premarital sex anywhere. Students may not consume alcohol or tobacco. In 2015, Liberty revised the code to give students the freedom to watch rated "R" movies and to play video games rated "M". In 2017, the curfew policy was changed to permit students age 20 and over to sign out and stay out past curfew. In 2018, the administration rejected a resolution from the student government that would have allowed off-campus drinking, "profane language" and the use of tobacco.

Convocation 

Liberty's convocation is the largest weekly gathering of Christian students in America.

Residential students at Liberty, at both undergraduate and graduate levels, are required to attend Convocation at the Vines Center twice per week on Wednesdays and Fridays. Any student commuting to campus who is under twenty-one years old is also required to attend. Commuting students over the age of twenty-one are encouraged to attend, but their attendance is not mandatory. For students with mandatory attendance requirements, upon arrival, they must report to the Resident Assistant assigned to them and sit in their assigned section to be counted as present. A fine of $25 is assessed for the first two absences with the fine rising to $50 for further offenses. Attending students are not permitted to leave before the official dismissal or they will be fined as if they had been absent. Students under mandatory attendance requirements may receive a "skip" once per semester if they make their intent to use the skip know to their Resident Assistant at least 24 hours before Convocation begins.

Gun use
Liberty University students are allowed to possess guns in the on-campus dorms.

Clubs and organizations 

According to Liberty's website, there are over 100 registered on-campus clubs and organizations.

Liberty Champion
Liberty Champion is Liberty University's official student newspaper.

In 2017, Will Young, the former editor of the Champion, recalled his experiences in a lengthy Washington Post article. In his first week in that role, he had been rebuked for attempting to get the campus's police blotter, he wrote, and the administration regularly overrode the student editors' decisions. There was, he claimed, "an infrastructure of thought-control that Falwell and his lieutenants [had] introduced into every aspect of Liberty University life" since 2016. Some sources Young spoke to believed the university installed spyware on the laptops they were issued. Student journalists became so frustrated that they launched an independent newspaper, the Lynchburg Torch, to cover stories the administration tried to suppress.

Speech and debate 
Liberty's Inter-Collegiate policy debate program ranked first overall for their division in the Championships at the National Debate Tournament in 2006, 2007, 2009, 2010, and 2011. The overall rankings include varsity, junior varsity, and novice results. In varsity rankings, Liberty finished 20th in 2005, 17th in 2006, 24th in 2007, 12th in 2008, 9th in 2009, 4th in 2010 and 4th in 2011. Through 2016, Liberty hosted the Virginia High School League's (VHSL) annual Debate State Championships every April. Subsequent to controversial remarks made by Chancellor Falwell in December 2015 following the 2015 San Bernardino attack, a number of high school students, teachers, debate coaches, and parents expressed concerns over Liberty's suitability for high school events, and some teams chose to not send students to compete at the annual State Championship in 2016. VHSL discontinued using Liberty as a venue for debate competition after 2016 to ensure an "environment free from harassment, personal threat, or physical or mental harm." In 2017, Liberty University's Debate Team finished atop the final rankings of all three national debate tournaments for the eighth time, sweeping the American Debate Association (ADA), the Cross Examination Debate Association (CEDA), and the National Debate Tournament (NDT). Liberty remains the only school in the country to finish first in all three rankings in a single year. The team has placed first in the CEDA for the last eight years, first in the NDT for seven out of the last eight years, and first in the ADA for 13 out of the last 14 years.

Athletics 

Liberty's athletic teams compete in Division I of the NCAA and are collectively known as the Liberty Flames. Liberty is a member of the ASUN Conference for 17 of its 20 varsity sports. Women's swimming competes in the Coastal Collegiate Sports Association, and women's field hockey competes in the Big East Conference. The field hockey team had belonged to the Northern Pacific Field Hockey Conference before that league's demise after the 2014 season. It competed as an independent in the 2015 season, then join the Big East Conference for the 2016 season. Starting in 2018, the football team began competing in the FBS as an independent. In 2020, Liberty entered the rankings in the AP Poll at 25 for the first time in program history. They finished the season being ranked 17 in the AP Poll and 18 in the Coaches Poll of top football teams in the country.

The university regularly competes for the Sasser Cup, the Big South's trophy for the university that has the best sports program among the member institutions. Liberty has won the Sasser Cup ten times, the most in the Big South. In 2012, Liberty became the first Big South school to win five consecutive Sasser Cups.

Football 
The Liberty Flames compete NCAA Division I Football Bowl Subdivision (FBS) as an independent. In 2021, Liberty University announced the Flames would become full members of Conference USA effective for the 2023 football season.   The team used Lynchburg's City Stadium as their home stadium until October 21, 1989, when the Flames played their first home game at Williams Stadium in front of 12,750 fans. Upgrades to the stadium increased capacity from 12,000 to 19,200 attendees and added luxury suites, a Club level, and a media area. Another expansion increased seating to 25,000. When a part of the FCS, Liberty ranked in the top 10 in the country in home attendance. In 2019, the Flames won the Cure Bowl against Georgia Southern, 23–16. In 2020, Liberty won the Cure Bowl again, defeating Coastal Carolina 39–34 in overtime. Liberty finished 10–1 with wins over a ranked Coastal Carolina and in state rival Virginia Tech in the school's best season to date. Liberty made its third FBS bowl appearance at the LendingTree Bowl in 2021, beating Eastern Michigan 56–20. The Flames last head coach was Hugh Freeze. In December 2022, the Flames hired Jamey Chadwell to be Liberty's next football coach, who was the football coach of Coastal Carolina.

Basketball 
Liberty University's basketball Vines Center can house up to 9,547 spectators for its games. Several members of the Liberty men's basketball (Liberty Flames basketball) team have been recruited to the NBA. The women's basketball team (Liberty Lady Flames basketball) was honored by the Big South "with the Top 25 'Best of the Best' moments in League history from 1983–2008, with Liberty University's 10-year women's basketball championship run from 1996–2007 being crowned the No. 1 moment in the Big South's first 25 years."

In 2019, the men's basketball program won the ASUN basketball tournament and earned an automatic bid to the NCAA basketball tournament. Liberty earned its highest ranking ever when it was selected as the No. 12 seed in the East Region. Liberty set a school record with their 29th win as they upset Mississippi State 80–76 in the first round of the East Region in the 2019 NCAA tournament.

Baseball 
The Liberty Baseball Stadium, completed in June 2013 and home to Liberty Baseball, was ranked No. 4 among college ballpark experiences by Stadium Journey website in 2015. The stadium includes 2,500 chairbacks, locker room, four indoor batting tunnels, four luxury suites, offices for the baseball program, a weight room, team room and a fully functional press area. Several Liberty Flames baseball players were drafted during the 2015 Major League Baseball draft. Local stations air some games. Some games have aired nationally on ESPNU.

Ice hockey 
Liberty University has men's and women's club ice hockey teams. Men's hockey started in 1985 when students at Liberty organized a team to compete against surrounding colleges and clubs but has since become a competitive club team competing against much larger schools such as University of Oklahoma, University of Delaware, and Penn State University. In 2006, Liberty University opened the 3,000-seat LaHaye Ice Center, a gift from Dr. Timothy and Beverly LaHaye. Also in 2006, Liberty became the only school in the state of Virginia to host a men's Division I American Collegiate Hockey Association (ACHA) club hockey team. Currently, Liberty University has Division I, II, and III men's teams and Division I and II women's teams. The men's Division I team is coached by Kirk Handy, while the women's Division I team is coached by Chris Lowes.

Cross country 
The men's and women's cross country teams have long been a conference powerhouse, and Josh McDougal (2007) and Samuel Chelanga (2009–2010) won the NCAA Division I individual laurels. Chelanga took two additional gold medals and three silvers in outdoor and indoor competition in three years and still holds the collegiate 10,000-meter record set in 2010, and won All-American honors 14 times.

Liberty University Online
Liberty University has an Internet education component called Liberty University Online, also known as LU Online or LUO, which provides degrees from associate's level to doctorate.

Online students constitute the overwhelming majority of the university's students and revenue, "subsidizing the university" and making them "a killing", according to faculty members, despite the "steep drop-off in quality from the traditional college to the online courses." Critics have argued that the online division subsidizes campus resources, such as the ski resort and gun range, and that online enrollment is run in a boiler room fashion. Online instructors are mainly engaged in answering emails and grading rather than creating and delivering content.

Liberty University Online Academy
Established in 2007, the Liberty University Online Academy (LUOA) is a K-12 school serving about 1,900 students. It is accredited by SACS (Southern Association of Schools and Colleges).

Finances, marketing, and recruitment 
In June 2021, Liberty University had $3.94 billion in assets and $474 million in liabilities. Its operating revenue was $1.15 billion and its operating expenses were $840 million. Its endowment was valued at $1.71 billion in fiscal year 2021. In fiscal year 2020, Liberty University received $800 million from online tuition and $361 million from residential student tuition. According to Third Way, Liberty uses less than 20 percent of its revenues for instruction.

In its early years, the university was held afloat financially by major donors.  In 1987, Liberty University's 501(c)(3) tax-exempt status was formally recognized by the IRS.

In the 1990s, the debt-saddled university was placed on probation several times by the Southern Association of Colleges and Schools because of heavy debt. In 1990, the university owed $110 million; in 1996, it owed $40 million. The Unification Church was an early donor. In 1994, the university received $3.5 million through Rev. Sun Myung Moon's Women's Federation for World Peace. In 1996 News World Communications loaned $400,000 to Liberty.

In 2006, the university had net assets—cash, property, investments and other holdings—of roughly $100 million. At the start of Jerry Falwell Jr.'s presidency in 2007, the university listed $259 million in assets. Five years later, in May 2012, Falwell Jr. said the total had risen to $1 billion, thanks to proceeds from its online learning program and from accelerated facility expansion.

In December 2010, Liberty sold $120 million in facilities bonds to finance expansion. It sold an additional $100 million in taxable bonds in January 2012 to help finance $225.2 million of planned capital projects around the campus over the next five years. The bond offering was part of Liberty University's campus transformation plan which included several renovations and additions to academic buildings and student housing, as well as fund the new Jerry Falwell Library and formation of a medical school. The bonds received a rating of "AA" from Standard & Poor's and in 2013 received an upgraded rating of "Aa3" along with a "stable outlook" projection from Moody's Investors Services based on "the increasing scope of the University's activity", "its large pool of financial reserves", "uncommonly strong operating performance", and "discipline around building and maintaining reserves".

In March 2017, Falwell Jr. said that the university's endowment stood at more than $1 billion and gross assets are in excess of $2 billion. The U.S. Department of Education rated Liberty as having a "perfect" financial responsibility score.

According to a 2018 report by The New York Times, most of Liberty University's revenue comes from taxpayer-funded sources.

In 2019, Falwell Jr. was accused of using the university for his family's financial benefit. Staff members said the university has funneled tuition money into real estate investments that benefit friends and family of the Falwells, including a shopping mall owned by the university and managed by Falwell's son Trey, a university vice president.  Falwell responded to the accusations by asserting that the FBI would investigate a "criminal conspiracy" in which individuals stole university property and shared it with reporters in an effort to damage his reputation.

Marketing and recruitment practices 
In 2018, ProPublica and the New York Times reported that Liberty University students were sixth in terms of receiving federal aid for the year 2017. Most of Liberty University's revenue came from taxpayer-funded sources. ProPublica/New York Times reported that each of the university's 300 salespeople were pressured to enroll up to eight students per day. A division of 60 salespeople targeted members of the military specifically because they had greater access to federal tuition assistance. The university's salespeople were instructed to make the university appear more affordable by describing the tuition costs per credits rather than per course. The salespeople were also instructed to not inform potential students of the Christian orientation of the education; the first classes include three required Bible-studies classes. The credits for the Bible-studies classes are usually not transferable to other universities, which disincentivizes students from leaving Liberty University for other universities. According to a former employee, the university accepts any student with a grade point average above 0.5 (equivalent to a D-minus).

Sponsorships 
Liberty University has sponsored NASCAR driver William Byron, also a LU student, since 2014 in a late model program run by Dale Earnhardt Jr.'s JR Motorsports. Liberty is in the midst of a deal with Byron and NASCAR Cup Series team Hendrick Motorsports that runs through 2026.

Federal funding 
In 2019, Liberty University reportedly received about $700 million in federal funding.

Student loans and defaults 
Liberty University students have a lower default rate compared to the national average of graduates from all schools. However, Liberty University students have a higher rate of defaults within three years of completing their studies compared to graduates of other private, non-profit, four-year colleges. Liberty University spends far less on instruction than traditional private universities, for-profit colleges and other nonprofit religious colleges.

In connection with being named to a Trump administration task force on deregulating higher education, university president Falwell alluded, as an example of regulatory overreach and "micromanagement", to Obama-era regulations that govern student loan forgiveness for students who have been cheated by fraudulent colleges.

Beliefs and values 
Liberty University is a conservative Evangelical college which is reflected in its honor code and other policies. The university teaches creationism alongside the science of evolutionary biology.

The university's honor code, called the "Liberty Way" emphasizes purity culture.  

The university's former president Jerry Falwell Jr. was accused of nepotism, racism, and alcohol use contravening Baptist teaching on teetotalism. Falwell and his wife Rebecca were involved in a number of sex scandals. These eventually led to his resignation on August 24, 2020.

Standing for Freedom Center
In November 2019, Liberty and Charlie Kirk of Turning Point USA launched a think tank subsidiary called the Falkirk Center for Faith and Liberty. The think tank hired Trump attorney Jenna Ellis and Trump surrogate Sebastian Gorka as fellows and paid for political Facebook ads promoting Trump and other Republican candidates during the 2020 election campaign. 
In March 2021, the university renamed the organization the "Standing for Freedom Center", having chosen not to renew Kirk's contract several months earlier.
In November 2021, the Standing for Freedom Center hosted former Secretary of State Mike Pompeo, author Eric Metaxas, and former Arkansas governor Mike Huckabee.

Politics

Influence 
Liberty University has been described as a "stage of choice in Republican presidential politics", and a "pilgrimage site for GOP candidates." According to The Washington Post, Republican candidates are drawn to the university because it is viewed as a "bastion of the Christian right". Ronald Reagan's close relationship with the university gave it significant publicity in its early years. In 1990, 41st U.S president George H. W. Bush was the first sitting U.S. president to speak at Liberty's commencement. In 1996, U.S. Supreme Court justice Clarence Thomas gave the commencement address at Liberty University.

Republican leaders Ronald Reagan, George W. Bush, Mitt Romney, Newt Gingrich, Jeb Bush, Bobby Jindal, and John McCain have visited the campus. Libertarian presidential candidate Gary Johnson spoke at the university. In 2017, President Donald Trump gave his first college commencement speech as sitting president at Liberty University. In 2019, Vice President Mike Pence gave the school's commencement address. Liberty was a satellite location for CPAC 2019, hosting numerous conservative speakers on-campus.

In 2009, LU stopped recognizing LU's Democratic Party student group; school officials said this was because the Democratic Party platform goes against the school's conservative Christian principles. Democrats such as Ted Kennedy, Bernie Sanders, and Jesse Jackson have spoken there. In 2018, former 39th U.S. president Jimmy Carter gave the commencement speech. However, Barack Obama, Joe Biden, and Hillary Clinton have rejected invitations to speak at LU.

In 2021, Liberty President Jerry Prevo told Scott Lamb, then the university’s senior vice president for communications and public engagement, that he wanted the school to become "a more effective political player by helping to influence elections." Prevo said getting conservative candidates elected was "one of our main goals". Politico wrote that his comments "raise new questions about the blurred line between education and politics at the university, which as a 501(c)(3) charity is not supposed to participate directly in political campaigns".

2015 concealed handguns remarks 
In a December 5, 2015, convocation speech, President Jerry Falwell Jr. encouraged the student body to obtain concealed handgun permits. Falwell discussed the 2015 San Bernardino attack and said, "If more good people had concealed-carry permits, then we could end those Muslims before they walked in." This was met with public condemnation for singling out the Muslim religion rather than the act of terrorism. Virginia governor Terry McAuliffe called the statement "repugnant". Falwell later said he was referring to the Muslim shooters in the San Bernardino attack, not all Muslims.

Links to Donald Trump 
The school is noted for its official embrace of Donald Trump before and during his term as U.S. president. The businessman twice spoke at the university Convocation: in 2012, when he was awarded an honorary doctor of business degree, and in 2016. As U.S. president, Trump was the keynote speaker at the May 2017 commencement, when he received an honorary Doctor of Laws degree. Falwell Jr. commended Trump for "bombing those in the Middle East who persecute and kill Christians," and that Trump had "proved that he is a man of his word.” As of 2022, three honorary degrees Trump received from other institutions have been rescinded, but Liberty has not rescinded the two it granted Trump.

Falwell Jr.'s uncritical support for Trump was characterized as a repudiation of Christian values. 

Various school officials and students criticized this support and the university's ties with Trump. Among them was Mark DeMoss, Falwell's chief of staff, who was forced to resign from Liberty's board of trustees. Another was Liberty alumnus Jonathan Merritt, whose invitation to speak on campus was rescinded. Still another was Christian author Jonathan Martin, who was expelled from campus.

The school reportedly censored articles critical of Trump in the student newspaper. In 2016, a student editor said that Falwell had censored an opinion column that criticized Trump  for his lewd comments caught on an Access Hollywood tape. Other articles in the student newspaper which mentioned Trump were reportedly spiked by faculty members. In 2018, two student editors were fired, reportedly for running articles critical of Trump; one of the student editors lost a $3,000-a-semester scholarship. In 2019, this censorship and other factors led the Foundation for Individual Rights in Education to rank Liberty University among the worst universities in terms of free speech.

In 2017, some students protested after President Trump criticized both white supremacists and counter-protesters at the August Charlottesville rally where three people died and 33 were injured. Following Trump's remarks, Falwell said that he was "so proud" of Trump for his "bold truthful" statement on the tragedy. A number of alumni returned their diplomas to Liberty University and called on the university to disavow Trump's remarks. The graduates argued that Trump's remarks were "incompatible with Liberty University's stated values, and incompatible with a Christian witness."

In 2018, some Liberty students went to Washington, D.C., to support President Trump's Supreme Court nominee Judge Brett Kavanaugh. That same year, students at the university gave a standing ovation to First Lady of the United States Melania Trump, along with several Trump cabinet officials who spoke at the university during a town hall about the drug epidemic.

In spring 2018, Liberty's Zaki Gordon Cinematic Arts Center co-produced a feature film called The Trump Prophecy. The film focuses on a retired firefighter from Florida who says God revealed to him in 2011 that Trump would one day be president. The film was shown in some cinemas in October 2018.

In 2019, The Wall Street Journal and Inside Higher Education reported that Liberty CIO John Gauger allegedly accepted cash, through his IT consulting firm unaffiliated with the school, to rig two online polls for Trump before he became a candidate.

Subsidiary businesses

Freedom Aviation
Freedom Aviation is a subsidiary company housed at the Lynchburg Regional Airport.

Notable alumni 

 Michael Andrew, Olympic swimmer
 Allison Ball, Kentucky State Treasurer
 Susan Wise Bauer, author and English instructor at The College of William & Mary
 Peter Alan Bell, osteopathic medicine doctor and current dean at Liberty University and the College of Osteopathic Medicine
 Shannon Bream, Host of Fox News @ Night, Supreme Court reporter, Fox News
 Sid Bream, former MLB baseball player
 William Byron, racing driver competing in the NASCAR Cup Series
 Jerry Falwell Jr., former president of Liberty University
 Antonio Gandy-Golden, professional football player
 William Franklin Graham IV, evangelist; grandson of Billy Graham
 Scottie James (born 1996), basketball player for Hapoel Haifa in the Israeli Basketball Premier League
 Rashad Jennings, former NFL running back
 Tim Lambesis, lead vocalist of the metalcore band As I Lay Dying
 Michael Licona, New Testament scholar and apologist, associate professor of theology at Houston Baptist University
 Alex McFarland, director of Christian World View at North Greenville University
 Vic Mignogna, anime voice actor
 Troy Nehls, Republican member of the U.S. House of Representatives
 Samantha Ponder, ESPN Sunday NFL Countdown host
 Vic Shealy, NCAA D1 football head coach at Houston Baptist University, former defensive coordinator at the University of Kansas
 TobyMac, Grammy Award-winning Christian hip hop artist; former member of DC Talk
 Jay Smith, ABC The Bachelorette (American TV series) Season 16 Contestant 
 Addison Smith, producer and news personality for One America News Network
 Jackie Walorski, Republican member of the U.S. House of Representatives
 Malik Willis, professional football player
 Debbie Yow, athletic director at NC State
 Eric Green, former NFL Tight End for the Pittsburgh Steelers

Notes

References

Further reading 
 Laats, Adam. 2018. Fundamentalist U. Oxford University Press.

External links 

 
  Standing for Freedom Center

 
Educational institutions established in 1971
Baptist Christianity in Virginia
Education in Lynchburg, Virginia
Universities and colleges accredited by the Southern Association of Colleges and Schools
Universities and colleges affiliated with the Southern Baptist Convention
Private universities and colleges in Virginia
Tourist attractions in Lynchburg, Virginia
Evangelicalism in Virginia
Opposition to same-sex marriage
Osteopathic medical schools in the United States
Buildings and structures in Lynchburg, Virginia
Non-profit organizations based in Lynchburg, Virginia
1971 establishments in Virginia
Conservatism in the United States
Seminaries and theological colleges in Virginia
Jerry Falwell